Regnum Christi, officially the Regnum Christi Federation (Latin: Regnum Christi Foederationis) is an international Catholic Federation. It is open to all lay Catholics and in addition has three consecrated branches, the Legion of Christ (seminarians and priests), consecrated women, and  consecrated men. Regnum Christi is dedicated to promoting the Catholic faith.  Their motto is "Love Christ, Serve People, Build the Church."

It was founded by Marcial Maciel, who led it until 2005. In 2006, Maciel was investigated by the Holy See and suspended from his ministry, initially over breaches of celibacy, and following public revelations later confirmed as sustained, over sexual abuse of minors. Maciel died in 2008, aged 87. After Maciel's death, and following more revelations, Pope Benedict XVI ordered an apostolic visitation of the Legion of Christ 2009. At the conclusion of that visitation, Cardinal Velasio De Paolis was delegated to conduct a visitation of Regnum Christi. On October 19, 2012, De Paolis published a cover letter for a summary of the Regnum Christi's charism which he had approved as a working document.

Ethos

Its spirituality can be described as five loves: love for Christ, love for Mary, love for souls, love for the Church, and love for the Pope.

Love for Christ is, for Regnum Christi members, a personal experience. Through the Gospel, the Cross, and the Eucharist, they come to know Christ intimately, and love him in a passionate way by embracing him as their model of holiness.

Love for Mary flows from imitating Christ; the Blessed Virgin is loved as both Mother of the Church and their mother. Regnum Christi members try to practice her virtues of faith, hope, charity, humility, and cooperation with Christ's plan of redemption.

Love for Souls is expressed in an ardent desire to spread Christ's kingdom in this world and an ardent charity for one's neighbour. Regnum Christi members want Christ to reign in everyone's heart and practice charity with all independent of any external factor.

Finally, there is Regnum Christi's love for Church and Pope. The Church is loved because it is the Body of Christ, and the beginning of his Kingdom on earth. Thus Regnum Christi members honor her by faith, submit to her in obedience, win souls for her through evangelization, and put her above all other earthly things in their lives. This love of the Church leads many in Regnum Christi to speak of being always in step with the Church, neither ahead nor behind: a commitment to Catholic Orthodoxy. It also explains the members' special affection for the Pope, who is supported in his charism of primacy and magisterium. All bishops in communion with the Roman Pontiff, as the Apostles' successors and teachers of the Catholic Faith, are likewise honored.

Activities of its members
Members of Regnum Christi make a commitment to specific daily prayers and meditation, weekly meetings, and annual spiritual retreats.  They are called to work actively in some concrete way in service to the Catholic Church - usually through specific Regnum Christi apostolates.  Its members call these works apostolates.  These include those specific Regnum Christi (Mission Youth [Youth for the Third Millennium], Helping Hands Medical Missions, Familia, Conquest, Challenge, and Pure Fashion), and other works in parishes or dioceses.

As of 2017, there were about 21,500 members in more than 30 countries.

Degrees of commitment
Among the members of Regnum Christi, there are three degrees of commitment:

1st and 2nd Degree
They are non-privately promised lay members of Regnum Christi. 2nd degree members offer a greater service to the Church and the movement.

3rd Degree: consecrated lay members

Lay Consecrated Men of Regnum Christi 
The Lay Consecrated Men of Regnum Christi are a branch of the Regnum Christi movement made up of lay men who dedicate themselves full-time to apostolate. They live consecrated life in the Church within the lay state.

They were formed on April 13, 1975 by Marcial Maciel with Álvaro Corcuera (who later became the general director of the Legionaries of Christ and Regnum Christi) as one of the founding members. For a long time the government of the consecrated men was under the Legionaries of Christ. However, after an apostolic visitation, Card. Velasio de Paolis decided that they would be better served by their own internal government. On May 17, 2012 Jorge Lopez was named the new leader after consulting the members. The same decree named Matthew Reinhart the director of North America and Europe.

The consecrated men share their spirituality with the rest of Regnum Christi but live it out in their own particular way. They currently number less than 100 in the world as there has been no interest since the sexual scandals and controversies of Marcial Maciel.

Consecrated Women of Regnum Christi 
The Consecrated Women of Regnum Christi  are a Society of Apostolic Life and branch of the Regnum Christi Movement made up of lay women who dedicate their lives fully to Christ through the evangelical vows of poverty, chastity and obedience lived within international communities. They live consecrated life in the Church within the lay state, being "in the world but not of the world". Their mission is to make present the mystery of Christ who goes out to people, reveals his love to them, gathers them together and forms them as apostles and Christian leaders, sending them out to evangelize people and society. They collaborate with Regnum Christi and the Church, accompanying thousands through formation of seminarians, lay leaders, teachers, students, young people and parents; preaching, offering spiritual direction, and leading courses, pilgrimages, missions and retreats in over 15 countries around the world.

The Consecrated Women of Regnum Christi was founded on 8 December 1969 in Mexico when three women, Margarita Estrada, Guadalupe Magaña, and Graciela Magaña, made private vows of poverty, chastity and obedience. For a long time the government of the Consecrated Women was under the Legionaries of Christ. However, after an apostolic visitation, Cardinal Velasio de Paolis decided that they would be better served by their own internal government. On 17 May 2012, Gloria Rodriguez was named the new leader after consulting the members. On November 25, 2018, they were approved by the Holy See, who established the Consecrated Women and the Lay Consecrated Men of Regnum Christi as Societies of Apostolic Life. 

The Consecrated Women of Regnum Christi share their spirituality with the rest of Regnum Christi but live it out in their own particular way.

Controversies
In 2012, a large group of Regnum Christi women formed a new consecrated women's community called Totus Tuus after the sexual scandal of Marcial Maciel came to light. Malén Oriol, formerly the Assistant General of the Consecrated of Regnum Christi, was part of the new group.

ECyD

There is also a special reduced level of commitment for young people who are members of ECyD (Experiences, Convictions and your Decisions).  The members of ECyD make commitments to be a better friend of Christ, by saying a few prayers, practicing virtue, and doing some apostolate. The youth have designated adult spiritual directors who are priests or consecrated women and are expected to meet with them monthly. Young members are always encouraged to commit to furthering their relationship with Christ by becoming consecrated men/women after high school.  (service project).

History
The first draft of the statutes for Regnum Christi was written and promulgated in 1959. On November 25, 2004, Pope John Paul II personally approved the statutes of the movement (this approval was for the core statutes not every single statute). These statutes define the goals, spirituality, and structure of Regnum Christi. In a November 21, 2011 letter, Cardinal Velasio de Paolis asked the consecrated in Regnum Christi to edit their core set of norms, and took force away from a more extensive set of norms. He set up a small commission to revise them.

Relationship with the Legion of Christ
Regnum Christi was founded out of the Legion of Christ and is directly related. When the statutes were approved in 2004, it was described as the apostolate of the Legion of Christ to expedite approval.  The Legion is a member of the Federation, therefore its members are closely involved with lay groups of Regnum Christi.: "Working with lay people is an essential part of the Legion’s apostolic methodology. The Legionaries carry out their apostolate above all with Regnum Christi members, forming them in human and Christian virtues, serving them with their priestly ministry, launching them in pastoral action, uniting efforts in their shared mission, and thus spurring on a great variety of works at the service of the Church."
On October 19, 2012, a working document put forward that the Legion is a branch of the Regnum Christi movement which would make each legionary a Regnum Christi Member.

Sexual abuse scandal

The Legion of Christ and Regnum Christi have received criticism both from members within the Catholic Church and without.

On May 1, 2010 the Vatican issued a statement condemning Maciel as "immoral" and acknowledging that Maciel had committed "true crimes". Pope Benedict also said he would appoint a delegate to reform the Legionaries’ charism, spirituality and constitutions. Pope Francis proceeded to revolutionize the Legion of Christ.  Under the guidance of Cardinal Velasio De Paolis, the congregation announced the order's complete restructuring at its Extraordinary General Chapter in Rome in January 2014.

In the early 2000s, 77 former students the Regnum Christi run high school in Wakefeild, RI made a plea to the Vatican to close the school citing psychological anguish, rigid schedules, manipulation, emotional abuse, and isolation from families as they were forced to live like nuns. The women have made their experiences public on a blog titled "49 Weeks a Year" as this was the amount of time they would be expected to spend at the boarding school, spending only 3 weeks with their families.

References

External links

Regnum Christi Sites
Official Site of Regnum Christi
Mission Network
Mission Youth
Programs of Mission Network
Conquest
Challenge
FAMILIA
Legion of Christ
Papal Delegate
49 Weeks a Year

 
Catholic spirituality
Legion of Christ